The Stroll (translit. Progulka) is a 2003 Russian romantic drama film directed by Alexei Uchitel. It was entered into the 25th Moscow International Film Festival.

Plot
While Olya, a twenty something buxom, is taking a stroll in Saint Petersburg, Alexey (Alyosha) approaches her, starts chatting, flirting and makes friends with her. She says she's a habit of fantasizing situations and making stories. She agrees to go with Alexey to Moscow, but insists that she'd pay for her ticket. Alexey starts loving her and believes she loves him too. He wants her to meet with his close friend Petyunya (Petya), who joins them after a while. Olya confesses to Petya that she's not made up her mind to go to Moscow with Alexey, and that she finds him more mature than Alexey. As she becomes friendly with Petya too, Alexey becomes jealous and asks Petya to not spoil their relationship. But Petya declines and tells him that she is more suitable for him. Soon they end up in a fist fight over a petty matter related to Olya, and she mediates to stop the fight. After a patch up, they continue walking, chatting and friendly banter. As they huddle in a shelter, Olya says it was a great luck that they met. She fantasizes that they are in an adventure novel, tells Alexey that he's a hero, he & Petya are real friends, and kisses him. She tells Petya that she's proud that a strong man like him paid attention to her and he'd win if he's serious. She appears to be enticing both of them.

Then she takes them to a bowling alley where Vsevolod, her fiancé, is waiting for them. As she goes to change out of her wet clothes, Alexey & Petya are shocked to learn that Olya is going to marry Vsevolod in a week, and that she'd spent the time with them to prove that she can walk all day without sitting down and win her bet. Alexey tells Vsevolod that besides the bet, he could't even imagine how much he'd lost, and it's too late to explain what that means. Olya rejoins them and confirms that all she did was only to win her bet. Alexey & Petya can't believe she was making a practical joke all day, her behavior & feelings were not for real. Obviously, they are deeply hurt. However, as they leave, she tries to explain that she didn't lie and was honest with them. She tries to follow them, but Vsevolod stops her and tries to console her. She's realized that she's deceived them and suddenly she runs for the door.

Cast

 Irina Pegova as Olya
 Pavel Barshak as Alyosha
 Yevgeny Tsyganov as Petya
 Yevgeni Grishkovetz as Seva
 Karen Badalov
 Madlen Dzhabrailova as gypsy on the tram
 Andrey Kazakov
 Aleksey Kolubkov
 Mikhail Krylov
 Sergei Puskepalis as accident participant
 Yuri Stepanov as accident participant
 Kseniya Kutepova as Catherine the Great
 Polina Kutepova
 Galina Tyunina

References

External links
 

2003 films
2003 romantic drama films
Russian romantic drama films
2000s Russian-language films
Films directed by Alexei Uchitel